This is a list of settlements in the Heraklion regional unit, Crete, Greece: 

 Achentrias
 Achlada
 Afrati
 Agia Varvara
 Agies Paraskies
 Agioi Deka
 Agios Kyrillos
 Agios Myronas
 Agios Syllas
 Agios Thomas
 Agios Vasileios, Archanes-Asterousia
 Agios Vasileios, Viannos
 Aidonochori
 Aitania
 Alagni
 Alithini
 Amariano
 Amiras
 Ampelouzos
 Ano Akria
 Ano Asites
 Ano Moulia
 Ano Viannos
 Anopoli
 Antiskari
 Apesokari
 Apostoloi
 Archanes
 Archangelos
 Arkalochori
 Arvi
 Asimi
 Askoi
 Astrakoi
 Astritsi
 Astyraki
 Avdou
 Avgeniki
 Charakas
 Charaki
 Charaso
 Chersonisos
 Chondros
 Choudetsi
 Choustouliana
 Dafnes
 Damania
 Damasta
 Demati
 Dionysi
 Douli
 Elaia
 Emparos
 Epano Vatheia
 Episkopi
 Ethia
 Evangelismos
 Faneromeni
 Fodele
 Galia
 Galifa
 Galipe
 Garipa
 Gazi
 Geraki
 Gergeri
 Gkagkales
 Gonies
 Gonies
 Gouves
 Grigoria
 Heraklion
 Ini
 Kainourgio Chorio
 Kalami
 Kalesia
 Kallithea
 Kalloni
 Kalo Chorio
 Kalyvia
 Kamares
 Kamari
 Kamariotis
 Kamilari
 Karavados
 Karouzana
 Kassanoi
 Kastamonitsa
 Kastelli, Faistos
 Kastelli, Heraklion
 Kastelliana
 Katalagari
 Kato Archanes Patsides
 Kato Asites
 Kato Symi
 Kato Vatheia
 Kato Viannos
 Katofygi
 Kefalovrysi
 Kera
 Keramoutsi
 Kerasia
 Keratokampos
 Klima
 Korfes
 Kounavoi
 Kouses
 Koxari
 Krasi
 Krevvatas
 Krousonas
 Kyparissos
 Lagoli
 Larani
 Lefkochori
 Ligortynos
 Liliano
 Limin Chersonisou
 Loures
 Loutraki
 Lyttos
 Magarikari
 Malia
 Marathos
 Martha
 Mathia
 Megali Vrysi
 Meleses
 Mesochorio
 Metaxochori
 Miamou
 Milliarades
 Mitropoli
 Mochos
 Moires
 Moni
 Moroni
 Myrtia
 Nea Alikarnassos
 Nipiditos
 Nyvritos
 Panagia
 Panasos
 Panorama
 Paranymfoi
 Partira
 Patsideros
 Pefkos
 Pentamodi
 Peri
 Pervola
 Petrokefali
 Petrokefalo
 Peza
 Pigaidakia
 Pitsidia
 Platanos
 Plora
 Polythea
 Pompia
 Potamies
 Praitoria
 Prinias
 Profitis Ilias
 Psari Forada
 Pyrgou
 Rodia 
 Roufas
 Sampas
 Sarchos
 Sgourokefali
 Siva
 Sivas
 Skalani
 Skinias
 Skourvoula
 Smari 
 Sokaras
 Stavies
 Stavrakia
 Sternes
 Stoloi
 Sykologos
 Tefeli
 Thrapsano
 Tylisos
 Tympaki
 Vachos
 Vagionia
 Vasileies
 Vasilika Anogeia
 Vasiliki
 Venerato
 Voni
 Vorizia
 Voroi
 Voutes
 Xeniakos
 Zaros
 Zoforoi

By municipality

See also
List of towns and villages in Greece

 
Heraklion